Spider monkeys are New World monkeys belonging to the genus Ateles, part of the subfamily Atelinae, family Atelidae. Like other atelines, they are found in tropical forests of Central and South America, from southern Mexico to Brazil. The genus consistes of seven species, all of which are under threat; the brown spider monkey is critically endangered. They are also notable for their ability to be easily bred in captivity.

Disproportionately long limbs and long prehensile tails make them one of the largest New World monkeys and give rise to their common name. They primarily eat fruits, but will also occasionally consume leaves, flowers, and insects. Due to their large size, spider monkeys require large tracts of moist evergreen forests, and prefer undisturbed primary rainforest. They are social animals and live in bands of up to 35 individuals, but will split up to forage during the day.

Recent meta-analyses on primate cognition studies indicated spider monkeys are the most intelligent New World monkeys. They can produce a wide range of sounds and will "bark" when threatened; other vocalisations include a whinny similar to a horse and prolonged screams.

They are an important food source due to their large size, so are widely hunted by local human populations; they are also threatened by habitat destruction due to logging and land clearing. Spider monkeys are susceptible to malaria and are used in laboratory studies of the disease. The population trend for spider monkeys is decreasing; the IUCN Red List lists one species as vulnerable, five species as endangered and one species as critically endangered.

Evolutionary history
Theories abound about the evolution of the atelines; one theory is they are most closely related to the woolly spider monkeys (Brachyteles), and most likely split from woolly monkeys (Lagothrix) in the South American lowland forest, to evolve their unique locomotory system. This theory is not supported by fossil evidence. Other theories include Brachyteles, Lagothrix and Ateles in an unresolved trichotomy, and two clades, one composed of Ateles and Lagothrix and the other of Alouatta and Brachyteles. More recent molecular evidence suggests the Atelinae split in the middle to late Miocene (13 Ma), separating spider monkeys from the woolly spider monkeys and the woolly monkeys.

Taxonomic classification  
The genus name Ateles derives from the ancient greek word , meaning "incomplete, imperfect", in reference to the reduced or non-existent thumbs of spider monkeys.

The genus contains seven species, and seven subspecies.

Family Atelidae
Subfamily Alouattinae: howler monkeys 
Subfamily Atelinae
Genus Ateles: spider monkeys
Red-faced spider monkey, Ateles paniscus
White-fronted spider monkey, Ateles belzebuth
Peruvian spider monkey, Ateles chamek
Brown spider monkey, Ateles hybridus
White-cheeked spider monkey, Ateles marginatus
Black-headed spider monkey, Ateles fusciceps
Brown-headed spider monkey, Ateles fusciceps fusciceps
Colombian spider monkey, Ateles fusciceps rufiventris
Geoffroy's spider monkey, Ateles geoffroyi
Hooded spider monkey Ateles geoffroyi grisescens
Yucatan spider monkey, Ateles geoffroyi yucatanensis
Mexican spider monkey, Ateles geoffroyi vellerosus
Nicaraguan spider monkey, Ateles geoffroyi geoffroyi
Ornate spider monkey, Ateles geoffroyi ornatus
Genus Brachyteles: muriquis (woolly spider monkeys) 
Genus Lagothrix: woolly monkeys

Anatomy and physiology

Disproportionately long, spindly limbs inspired the spider monkey's common name. This adaptation to their strictly arboreal lifestyle serves as a fifth hand. When the monkey walks, its arms practically drag on the ground. Unlike many monkeys, they do not use their arms for balance when walking, instead relying on their tails. The hands are long, narrow and hook-like, and have reduced or non-existent thumbs. The fingers are elongated and recurved.

Their hair is coarse, ranging in color from ruddy gold to brown and black, or white in a rare number of specimens. The hands and feet are usually black. Heads are small with hairless faces. The nostrils are very far apart, which is a distinguishing feature of spider monkeys.

Spider monkeys are highly agile, and they are said to be second only to the gibbons in this respect. They have been seen in the wild jumping from tree to tree.

Female spider monkeys have a clitoris that is especially developed; it may be referred to as a pseudo-penis because it has an interior passage, or urethra, that makes it almost identical to the penis, and retains and distributes urine droplets as the female moves around. This urine is emptied at the bases of the clitoris, and collects in skin folds on either side of a groove on the perineal. Researchers and observers of spider monkeys of South America look for a scrotum to determine the animal sex because these female spider monkeys have pendulous and erectile clitorises long enough to be mistaken for a penis; researchers may also determine the animal's sex by identifying scent-marking glands that may be present on the clitoris.

Behavior

Spider monkeys form loose groups, typically with 15 to 25 individuals, but sometimes up to 30 or 40. During the day, groups break up into subgroups. The size of subgroups and the degree to which they avoid each other during the day depends on food competition and the risk of predation. The average subgroup size is between 2 and 8 but can sometimes be up to 17 animals. Also less common in primates, females rather than males disperse at puberty to join new groups. Males tend to stick together for their whole lives. Hence, males in a group are more likely to be related and have closer bonds than females. The strongest social bonds are formed between females and their young offspring.

Spider monkeys communicate their intentions and observations using postures and stances, such as postures of sexual receptivity and of attack. When a spider monkey sees a human approaching, it barks loudly similar to a dog. When a monkey is approached, it climbs to the end of the branch it is on and shakes it vigorously to scare away the possible threat. It shakes the branches with its feet, hands, or a combination while hanging from its tail. It may also scratch its limbs or body with various parts of its hands and feet. Seated monkeys may sway and make noise. Males and occasionally adult females growl menacingly at the approach of a human. The monkeys also defecate and urinate toward the intruder.

Spider monkeys are diurnal and spend the night sleeping in carefully selected trees. Groups are thought to be directed by a lead female, which is responsible for planning an efficient feeding route each day. Grooming is not as important to social interaction, owing perhaps to a lack of thumbs.

Spider monkeys have been observed avoiding the upper canopy of the trees for locomotion. One researcher speculated this was because the thin branches at the tops of trees do not support the monkeys as well.

At , the spider monkey brain is twice the size of the brain of a howler monkey of equivalent body size; this is thought to be a result of the spider monkeys' complex social system and their frugivorous diets, which consist primarily of ripe fruit from a wide variety (over 150 species) of plants. This requires the monkeys to remember when and where fruit can be found. The slow development may also play a role: the monkeys may live from 20 to 27 years or more, and females give birth once every 17 to 45 months. Gummy, presumably the oldest living spider monkey in captivity, is presumed to have been born wild in 1962 and currently resides at Fort Rickey Childrens Discovery Zoo located in Rome, New York.

Diet

Spider monkeys eat fleshy fruits 71 to 83 percent of the time. They can live for long periods on only one or two kinds of fruits and nuts. They eat the fruits of many big forest trees, and because they swallow fruits whole, the seeds are eventually excreted and fertilized by the feces. Studies show the diet of spider monkeys changes their reproductive, social, and physical behavioral patterns. Most feeding happens from dawn to 10 am. Afterward, the adults rest while the young play. Through the rest of the day, they may feed infrequently until around 10 pm. If food is scarce, they may eat insects, leaves, bird eggs, bark and honey.

Spider monkeys have a unique way of getting food: a lead female is generally responsible for finding food sources. If she cannot find enough food for the group, it splits into smaller groups that forage separately. The traveling groups have four to nine animals. Each group is closely associated with its territory. If the group is big, it spreads out.

Reproduction
The female chooses a male from her group for mating. Both males and females use "anogenital sniffing" to check their mates for readiness for copulation.  The gestation period ranges from 226 to 232 days. Each female bears only one offspring on average, every three to four years.

Until six to ten months of age, infants rely completely on their mothers. Males are not involved in raising the offspring.

A mother carries her infant around her belly for the first month after birth. After this, she carries it on her lower back. The infant wraps its tail around its mother's and tightly grabs her midsection. Mothers are very protective of their young and are generally attentive mothers. They have been seen grabbing their young and putting them on their backs for protection and to help them navigate from tree to tree. They help the more independent young to cross by pulling branches closer together. Mothers also groom their young.

Male spider monkeys are one of the few primates that do not have a penis bone (baculum).

Cultural depictions
Spider monkeys are found in many aspects of the Mesoamerican cultures. In the Aztec 260-day calendar, Spider Monkey (Nahua Ozomatli) serves as the name for the 11th day. In the corresponding Maya calendar, Howler Monkey (Batz) is substituted for Spider Monkey. In present-day Maya religious feasts, spider monkey impersonators serve as a kind of demonic clowns. In Classical Maya art, they are ubiquitous, often shown carrying cacao pods.

Captain Simian & the Space Monkeys features a spider monkey named Spydor who is the smallest of the crew.

References

External links

 
Fauna of the Amazon